Morenci is the name of some communities in the United States:

 Morenci, Arizona
 Morenci, Michigan